Ján Nemček (born 9 October 1987) is a Slovak football player who currently plays for FC Petržalka 1898. His former club were the Slovak 3. liga club PŠC Pezinok and Austrian FC Stadlau, also FK Bodva and SK Hradec Králové.

References

External links

1987 births
Living people
Slovak footballers
ŠK Slovan Bratislava players
FC Senec players
FC Hradec Králové players
FK Bodva Moldava nad Bodvou players
FC Petržalka players
Association football midfielders